Sukhinichsky District is an administrative and municipal district (raion), one of the twenty-four in Kaluga Oblast, Russia. It is located in the center of the oblast. Its administrative center is the town of Sukhinichi. Population:  26,968 (2002 Census);  The population of Sukhinichi accounts for 64.5% of the district's total population.

References

Sources

Districts of Kaluga Oblast